In supergravity and supersymmetric representation theory, Adinkra symbols are a graphical representation of supersymmetric algebras. Mathematically they can be described as colored finite connected  simple graphs, that are bipartite and n-regular. Their name is derived from Adinkra symbols of the same name, and they were introduced by Michael Faux and Sylvester James Gates in 2004.

Overview
One approach to the representation theory of super Lie algebras is to restrict attention to representations in one space-time dimension and having  supersymmetry generators, i.e., to  superalgebras. In that case, the defining algebraic relationship among the supersymmetry generators reduces to

.

Here  denotes partial differentiation along the single space-time coordinate. One simple realization of the  algebra consists of a single bosonic field , a fermionic field , and a generator  which acts as

,
.

We can represent this algebra graphically using one solid vertex, one hollow vertex, and a single colored edge connecting them.

See also
Feynman diagram

References

External links
 http://golem.ph.utexas.edu/category/2007/08/adinkras.html
 https://www.flickr.com/photos/science_and_thecity/2796684536/
 https://www.flickr.com/photos/science_and_thecity/2795836787/
http://www.thegreatcourses.com/courses/superstring-theory-the-dna-of-reality.html

Supersymmetry